Hednotodes callichroa is a species of snout moth in the genus Hednotodes. It was described by Oswald Bertram Lower in 1893 and is known from Australia.

References

Moths described in 1893
Chrysauginae